Tahir Salahov's house-museum – Memorial museum of Azerbaijani artist, Hero of Socialist Labor, USSR and Azerbaijan State Prize laureate, People's Artist of the USSR, Professor Tahir Salahov.
The museum is located in Ilyas Afandiyev Street, close to "Icherisheher" State Historical-Architectural Reserve.

History
On 13 October 2011, President of Azerbaijan Ilham Aliyev signed an order to establish Tahir Salahov's House Museum in Baku.

The museum was created by the Icherisheher State Historical-Architectural Reserve Department in 2012.

Exposition
The museum exposition is dedicated to the life and activity of the Azerbaijani artist Tahir Salahov. The artist gifted 735 exhibits to the house-museum.

Among them there are his paintings, personal belongings, carpet collection and photo archive.

The exposition covers 3 floors of the museum building.

Tahir Salahov's workshop is located on the 3rd floor of the museum.

References

Museums in Baku
Culture in Baku
2012 establishments in Azerbaijan